The European University Skopje is a private university headquartered in Skopje, North Macedonia.

History
The European University begins with the foundation of The Faculty of Social Sciences in 2001. The activities at the university were recognized in June 2005 when it was accredited by The Accreditation Board of Republic of North Macedonia.

November 2006 saw the founding and accreditation of three faculties: 
 Faculty of Communication and Media, 
 Faculty of Public Administration, 
 Faculty of Art and Design. 
Until then there were two faculties - The Faculty of Economic Sciences and The Faculty of Informatics.

In May 2006, based on the decision number 12 of The Accreditation of Republic of North Macedonia, the adequacy of the programs of The European University according to the European standards of the 3+2 module of studying was confirmed.

Address
 European University - Republic of North Macedonia
 Kliment Ohridski Blvd 68 
 Skopje 1000, North Macedonia

Faculties
The university has seven faculties:
 Faculty of Economics
 Faculty of Informatics
 Faculty of Law
 Faculty of Art and Design
 Faculty of Detectives and Criminology
 Faculty of Dentistry

Accreditation
The official list of accredited universities and schools in the Republic of North Macedonia is maintained by the Ministry of Education and Science and can be found at http://www.mon.gov.mk/index.php/dokumenti/akreditacii

The university is the sole higher education institution of the Balkans whose undergraduate and postgraduate study programs of the Faculty of Economy has been accredited by the International Assembly for Collegiate Business Education (IACBE). IACBE is a body for the accreditation of business and study programs, connected to business of undergraduate and postgraduate studies in colleges and universities. IACBE has over 200 member universities. Their accreditation means that the degrees obtained from the EURM are acknowledged by colleges in the USA and the other members of IACBE.

Notable faculty
 Zoran Jolevski, former Macedonian Ambassador to the United States

References

External links
 
 FDI Atlas

Universities in North Macedonia
Education in Skopje
2005 establishments in the Republic of Macedonia
Educational institutions established in 2005